The Waterside, is a festival marketplace on the Elizabeth River in downtown Norfolk, Virginia, opened June 1, 1983. While the Waterside Annex was demolished May 16, 2016, the main portion was renovated and reopened as Waterside District in May 2017.

Beginning in the late 1970s, mall-developer James W. Rouse and the Rouse Company had conceived the festival marketplace (e.g., Norfolk's Waterside) as an important component to redeveloping a declining downtown, a seminal catalyst to further development. The concept combined to varying degrees major restaurants, specialty retail shops, food courts and nightlife activities.

Like other shopping centers, malls and marketplaces, the Waterside has evolved through numerous business cycles. Originally, Waterside featured mostly restaurants like The Baitshack on the first floor.  There were small nautically themed stores  as well as an arcade. The balconied second floor featured more niche stores and kiosks. A second phase was added to the complex in the 1980s, while the mid-1990s saw a decline in business, mitigated by the opening of nearby MacArthur Center. In the early-2000s, the upstairs stores were replaced by entertainment venues, such as Jillian's arcade.

The Norfolk Redevelopment and Housing Authority purchased the Waterside from its private owner, Enterprise Real Estate Services, in 1999,
at the time considered a temporary arrangement. The Waterside delivered approximately $2.2 million in tax revenue in 2007, down $300,000 since 2004. Norfolk will subsidize the facility with $1 million in 2008 and currently is studying the next phase of the marketplace's repositioning.

Waterside District
The City of Norfolk and The Cordish Companies broke ground on the new Waterside District in August 2015. The new venue will be in the footprint of the old Waterside and consist of dining and entertainment venues. Its grand opening took place on May 11, 2017.

A critical component of Norfolk's ongoing post-World War II revitalization, the complex connects via a cross-street pedestrian bridge to a parking garage, sits at the foot of the Portsmouth Ferry terminal, and connects via a waterfront promenade to the downtown, the nearby baseball stadium (Harbor Park), naval museum (Nauticus) and waterfront neighborhood of Freemason Harbor.

See also 
 Faneuil Hall in Boston
 South Street Seaport in New York City
 Harborplace in Baltimore 
 Station Square in Pittsburgh
 The Landing in Jacksonville

References

External links
 

Shopping malls in Virginia
Shopping malls established in 1983
Economy of Norfolk, Virginia
Waterside
Redeveloped ports and waterfronts in the United States
Tourist attractions in Norfolk, Virginia
Downtown Norfolk, Virginia